Bufotes latastii, commonly known as the  Baltistan toad, Ladakh toad or vertebral-banded toad, is a species of toad in the family Bufonidae. It is found in alpine forests, coniferous forests, grasslands, paddy fields, mountain desert and roadsides. It often lives near water, like lakes and ponds, in the riparian growth. It can be beneficial to humans as it feeds on insects and their larvae within areas of agriculture.

It is generally fairly common, and not considered threatened by the IUCN, although locally declining due to habitat loss (logging), pesticides, and other sources of pollution.

References

latastii
Amphibians of Pakistan
Amphibians described in 1882
Taxonomy articles created by Polbot